Enomoto (written:  or ) is a Japanese surname. Notable people with the surname include: 

, Japanese baseball player
, Japanese voice actress and singer
, Japanese model and actress
, Japanese painter
, Japanese footballer
, Japanese business executive and space tourist
Isami Enomoto (1929-2016), American ceramicist
, Japanese footballer
, Japanese actress
, Japanese comedian
, Japanese footballer
, Japanese singer-songwriter
, Japanese manga artist
, Japanese poet
, Japanese basketball player
, Japanese manga artist
, Admiral of the Imperial Japanese Navy 
, Japanese footballer
, Japanese footballer
, Japanese ice hockey player
, Japanese Blogger

Fictional characters
, a character in the manga series First Love Limited
, a character in the manga series Love Lab

See also
Enomoto: New Elements that Shake the World, a manga series by Shunji Enomoto

Japanese-language surnames